"Fantasy" is a single by the Japanese rock band Alice Nine. It is featured on their first album Zekkeishoku and coincided with the double a-side release "Akatsuki/Ikuoku no Chandelier".
The single was released in two versions, one with a bonus track and the other with a DVD of the "Fantasy" music video.

Track listing
Type A (CD & DVD)
 "Fantasy"
 "Lemon"
 "Fantasy" music video

Type B (CD only)
 "Fantasy"
 "Lemon" (檸檬)
 "Tentai Umbrella" (Umbrella of Heavenly Bodies) (天体アンブレラ)

Reference list

External links
 King Records' Official Website
 Official myspace

Alice Nine songs
Japanese-language songs
2006 singles
2006 songs